Auston Morgan Rotheram (11 June 1876 – 13 November 1946) was an Irish polo player who competed at the 1908 Summer Olympics.

Biography
He was born in Sallymount House, County Westmeath and died in Cheltenham.

Together with Percy O'Reilly, John Hardress Lloyd and John Paul McCann, he was a member of the Ireland team that won a silver medal. The Ireland team was part of the Great Britain Olympic team.

References

1876 births
1946 deaths
English polo players
Members of the Ireland polo team at the 1908 Summer Olympics
Medalists at the 1908 Summer Olympics
Olympic silver medallists for Great Britain
Olympic medalists in polo